Ruben Scheire (born 6 December 1991) is a Belgian mountain bike racer. He rode at the cross-country event at the 2016 Summer Olympics.

References

1991 births
Living people
Belgian male cyclists
Cyclists at the 2016 Summer Olympics
Olympic cyclists of Belgium
Sportspeople from Ghent
Cyclists from East Flanders
21st-century Belgian people